Kui Tan Sports Club is a Hong Kong football club which currently competes in the Hong Kong Third Division.

History
In 1975–76, Kui Tan won the Hong Kong Third A Division title, the first trophy in the club's history.

In 1977–78, Kui Tan finished runners up in the Hong Kong Second Division title and were promoted into the Hong Kong First Division for the first time. They also won the Hong Kong Junior Challenge Shield, the first cup competition victory in club history.

During their maiden season in the First Division, Kui Tan achieved a respectable fifth-place finish. The following season, the club were mired in a race for survival in the league with HKFC and Yuen Long. In the final match of the season against HKFC, keeper Lo Kwok Wah committed a crucial foul in the box leading to an HKFC penalty and goal. The loss meant that Kui Tan would finish one point behind HKFC in the table and thus, Kui Tan were relegated.

In 1989–90, Kui Tan finished 4th in the Second Division but were promoted after champions Mei Ching and runners up Fukien both declined promotion.

During the 1992–93 season, Kui Tan finished second last in the table and were due to be relegated. However, Ernest Borel folded and Kui Tan were permitted to remain.

Kui Tan would once again finish second last in 1994–95 and were relegated along with bottom dwellers Kitchee. The following year, they won runners up in the Second Division but ultimately declined promotion. They have yet to come as close to the top flight since.

In 2007–08 Kui Tan were relegated into the Hong Kong Third Division following a last place finish.

Honours

League
 Hong Kong Second Division
Runners-up (2): 1977–78, 1995–96
 Hong Kong Third Division
Champions (1): 1975–76

Cup Competitions
Hong Kong Junior Shield
Champions (1): 1977–78

References

External links
 Kui Tan at HKFA

Football clubs in Hong Kong
Hong Kong Third Division League